Aromia is a genus of round-necked longhorn beetles of the subfamily Cerambycinae.

Species
 Aromia bungii (Faldermann, 1835)
 Aromia malayana Hayashi, 1977
 Aromia moschata (Linnaeus, 1758)

Callichromatini